The Happiness of Grinzing (German: Das Glück von Grinzing) is a 1933 Czech musical film directed by Otto Kanturek and starring Iván Petrovich, Gretl Theimer and Alfred Gerasch. It was produced in German and several of the cast and crew had recently left Germany following the Nazi takeover there. It was shot at the Barrandov Studios in Prague. The film's sets were designed by the art director . A separate Czech-language version, In the Little House Below Emauzy, was also shot at the same time. Such multiple-language versions were common during the early years of sound film before dubbing became more widespread. In German-speaking parts of Czechoslovakia it was released under the title Das Häuschen in Grinzing.

An operetta film, a popular genre during the decade, it is based on the 1911 operetta  which used melodies by Joseph Lanner (1801–1843). The title refers to Grinzing, once a small town outside Vienna and now a suburb of the city. It was one of a group of films produced during the period that set musical melodramas in the outskirts of the Austrian capital, generally appealing to the nostalgic tastes of audiences.

Cast
 Iván Petrovich as Hans Martin, postilion
 Gretl Theimer as Liesl
 Marion Taal as Resi
 Maria Freene as Countess Lubetzky
 Alfred Gerasch as Count Lubetzky
 Ferdinand Hart as Anton Huber
  as Franz Weigl - inn keeper
  as August Stiebitz
 Willy Bauer as Alois, servant
 Antonín Schmerzenreich as Count Willner

References

Sources 
 Goble, Alan. The Complete Index to Literary Sources in Film. Walter de Gruyter, 1999.
 Dassanowsky, Robert von. Austrian Cinema: A History. McFarland, 2005.

External links 
 
 Das Glück von Grinzing, filmportal.de

1933 films
1933 musical films
Czechoslovak musical films
Czech musical films
1930s German-language films
Films based on operettas
Operetta films
Films shot at Barrandov Studios
1933 multilingual films
Films set in Vienna